Vestnes is a municipality in Møre og Romsdal county, Norway. Vestnes is part of the  traditional district of Romsdal. The administrative centre of the municipality is the village of Vestnes. Other villages in the municipality include Vikebukt, Vik, Vågstranda, Øverås, Fiksdal, Tomrefjord, and Tresfjord.

The area is known for nature and outdoor pursuits, and has a long history in ship building and maritime crafts. The village of Vestnes (Helland) dates back to early medieval times, and has 24-hour ferry and water taxi service with the town of Molde to the northeast. The ferry takes about 35-minutes each way.

The  municipality is the 239th largest by area out of the 356 municipalities in Norway. Vestnes is the 142nd most populous municipality in Norway with a population of 6,936.

History

The municipality of Vestnes was established in the fall of 1838 when the western district of the large Veøy Municipality was separated to form its own municipality (see formannskapsdistrikt law). On 1 January 1899, the southern district of the municipality (population: 1,408) was separated from Vestnes to form the new municipality of Sylte. During the 1960s, there were many municipal mergers across Norway due to the work of the Schei Committee. On 1 January 1964, the neighboring municipalities of Vestnes (population: 3,895) and Tresfjord, formerly known as Sylte, (population: 1,319) were merged to form a new, larger municipality called Vestnes. On 1 January 2021, the  Vågstranda area in the northwestern part of Rauma Municipality was transferred to the neighboring municipality of Vestnes.

A Viking barrow burial was uncovered at Villa Farm near Vestnes in 1894. Now in the British Museum's collection in London, the rich grave finds include a pair of oval brooches and other dress accessories, a comb, remnants of a bucket and a box, a bridle-bit, agricultural tools, a bronze bowl, a whalebone plaque, a weaving batten and a whetstone.

Name
The municipality (originally the parish) is named after the old Vestnes farm, since the first Vestnes Church was built there. The first element is vestr which means "west" and the last element is nes which means "headland". Before 1889, the name was written Vestnæs.

Coat of arms
The coat of arms was granted on 11 April 1980. The arms have a red background with two triangular gold spikes pointing right. The arms represent the geography of the municipality: a headland between two fjords—the Tresfjorden and the Tomrefjorden.

Museums
The Møre og Romsdal Agricultural Museum (Landbruksmuseet for Møre og Romsdal) was established in the municipality at the Gjermundnes Farm in 1979.

Churches

The Church of Norway has five parishes within the municipality of Vestnes. It is part of the Indre Romsdal prosti (deanery) in the Diocese of Møre.

Geography

Vestnes is located in an area of great natural splendour on the southern shores of the vast Romsdal Fjord. The Tresfjorden and Tomrefjorden branch off Romsdal Fjord to the south. Vestnes borders Rauma Municipality to the east, as well as Stordal Municipality and Ørskog Municipality to the south. Across the Moldefjorden to the north is Midsund Municipality and Molde Municipality.

Government
All municipalities in Norway, including Vestnes, are responsible for primary education (through 10th grade), outpatient health services, senior citizen services, unemployment and other social services, zoning, economic development, and municipal roads. The municipality is governed by a municipal council of elected representatives, which in turn elect a mayor. The municipality falls under the Møre og Romsdal District Court and the Frostating Court of Appeal.

Municipal council
The municipal council of Vestnes is made up of 23 representatives that are elected to four year terms. The party breakdown of the council is as follows:

Mayor
The mayors of Vestnes (incomplete list):
2015–present: Geir Inge Lien (Sp)
2007-2015: Øyvind Uren (Ap)
2003-2007: Knut Magne Flølo (FrP)
1999-2003: Roald Fiksdal (Ap)
1987-1999: Petter Inge Bergheim (Sp)

Economy
Vestnes is a relatively good agricultural community with emphasis on livestock and milk production. Vestnes, however, is primarily a manufacturing district. The main industry is the ship-building industry with a number of different companies located in Vestnes. A total of 63% of industry employment (2004) in Vestnes is part of the ship-building industry. Other that shipbuilding, there are several companies in the food, textile and clothing, wood products, furniture, and metal products industries in Vestnes.

Media
The newspaper Vestnesavisa is published in Vestnes.

Transportation
The European route E39 highway goes through Vestnes on its way from Sjøholt to Molde. The European route E136 highway goes through Vestnes on its way from Ålesund to Dombås. The two highways intersect and share part of the route through Vestnes. The new Tresfjord Bridge carries the E136 highway over the Tresfjorden rather than the previous roadway that follows the shoreline all the way around the fjord.

Notable residents

 Peter L. Rypdal (1909 in Tresfjord – 1988) a fiddler and traditional folk music composer
 Jakob Rypdal (1926 in Tresfjord – 2015) a Norwegian triple jumper
 Terje Rypdal (born 1947) a Norwegian guitarist and composer, lives in Tresfjord
 Lodve Solholm (born 1949 in Vestnes) county governor of Møre og Romsdal, 2009 to 2018
 Barry Gjerde (born 1951 in Vestnes) Canadian-Japanese voice actor, works in Japan 
 Bjørn Rune Gjelsten (born 1956 in Tomrefjord) powerboat racer, joint owner of Wimbledon F.C.
 Kjetil Rekdal (born 1968 in Vestnes) football manager and a former footballer with 484 club caps and 83 for Norway 
 Bernt Hulsker (born 1977), a retired footballer with over 250 club caps, grew up in Vestnes

References

External links

Municipal fact sheet from Statistics Norway 
Vestnes official web site

 
Municipalities of Møre og Romsdal
1838 establishments in Norway